The Dean of Sheffield is the head (primus inter pares – first among equals) and chair of the chapter of canons, the ruling body of Sheffield Cathedral. The dean and chapter are based at the Cathedral Church of Saint Peter and Saint Paul in Sheffield. Before 2000 the post was designated as a provost, which was then the equivalent of a dean at most English cathedrals. The cathedral is the mother church of the Diocese of Sheffield and seat of the Bishop of Sheffield.

List of deans

Provosts
1931–1948 Alfred Jarvis
1949–1965 Howard Cruse
1966–1974 Ivan Neill
1974–1988 Frank Curtis
1988–1994 John Gladwin
1995–13 April 2000 Michael Sadgrove (became Dean)

Deans
13 April 2000–2003 Michael Sadgrove
4 October 200331 December 2020 Peter Bradley
21 October 20206 November 2021: Geoffrey Harbord (Acting)
6 November 2021present: Abi Thompson

References

Deans of Sheffield
Deans of Sheffield
 
Deans of Sheffield